The 1977 Cal State Northridge  Matadors football team represented California State University, Northridge as a member of the California Collegiate Athletic Association (CCAA) during the 1977 NCAA Division II football season. Led by second-year Jack Elway head coach, Cal State Northridge compiled an overall record of 7–3–1 with a mark of 1–1 in conference play, placing second in the CCAA. The team outscored its opponents 264 to 179   for the season. The Matadors played home games at North Campus Stadium in Northridge, California.

Schedule

Team players in the NFL
No Cal State Northridge players were selected in the 1978 NFL Draft.

The following finished their college career in 1977, were not drafted, but played in the NFL.

References

Cal State Northridge
Cal State Northridge Matadors football seasons
Cal State Northridge Matadors football